Homalocantha lamberti is a species of sea snail, a marine gastropod mollusk in the family Muricidae, the murex snails or rock snails.

Distribution
This marine species occurs off New Caledonia.

References

 Poirier, J., 1883. Révision des Murex. Nouvelles Archives du Muséum d'Histoire naturelle 5: 13–128, sér. série 2

Muricidae
Gastropods described in 1883